Philippe-François Véras, (1690 ? - 1742), was a French composer, organist and harpsichordist active in Lille about 1740.

Veras was organist at the Saint-Maurice church in Lille, and published a small collection of harpsichord works in Paris, in 1740 according to the legal document Privilège Général.  A small amount of biographical information can be gleaned from this 1740 publication, as it plainly states he was employed there.  As was typical of harpsichord works of this period, the pieces are organized in "Ordres" (a free-form suite of compositions containing descriptive, picturesque titles) in a manner similar to François Couperin before him.  The music of Véras suggests he was influenced by Italian styles: the melodic contours and harmonic language of his works show a substantial stylistic affinity with the sonatas of Domenico Scarlatti.  The third movement of his first "ordre" is entitled "La Volliante, dans le goût italien" (La Volliante, in the Italian taste/manner). 

A facsimile edition of these works was published in 1982 by Minkoff (Genève), .

Harpsichord works 

Pièces de Clavecin - Premier Livre (1740)
Premier ordre in G/g 
Badines 1 & 2
Les Brunes - Les Brunais
La Volliante dans le goût italien
Les Bergères 1e & 2e parties
Tambourins 1 & 2
1er Menuet (Tambourin 3)
2e Menuet (Tambourin 4)  
Deuxième ordre in C/c 
La Divertissante
Le Cocquelet
La Duchesse
La Galante
Sarabande
Tambourins 1 & 2
Troisième ordre in a/A
Le Rédiculle
La Fidèle
La Légère
Tambourins 1 & 2
La Belle
Les Sauvages: Menuets 1 & 2  
Quatrième Ordre in D/d 
La Riante, rondeau
La Milordine
Rigaudons 1 & 2
La Belle Idée, rondeau
La Ginguette

Scores

References 
 Fuller, D.  Veras, Ph(ilippe) F(rançoi)s. Grove Music Online.

External links 
 YouTube ; 3e Suite, David Bolton, harpsichord

See also
 List of French harpsichordists

18th-century classical composers
French Baroque composers
French classical composers
French male classical composers
French harpsichordists
18th-century French composers
18th-century French male musicians
17th-century male musicians